The Zeno family, also known as Zen, was a patrician family that belonged to the small circle of Venetian noble families, whose members played important role in the history of the Republic of Venice.

Notable members 
Apostolo Zeno (1669–1750) Venetian poet, librettist, and journalist.
Carlo Zeno (1333–1418) Venetian Admiral during War of Chioggia, but also mercenary
Giovanni Battista Zeno (died 1501), Roman Catholic Cardinal since 1468, nephew of Pope Paul II
Nicolò Zen the younger (1515–1565) Venetian Senator and hydraulic engineer 
Pietro Zeno, Lord of Andros and Syros (died 1427)
Reniero Zeno (died 1268) 45th Doge of Venice
Zeno brothers: Nicolò (c. 1326–c. 1402) and Antonio (died c. 1403), marine merchants and putative explorers

The family was also the owner of Villa Zeno.

Italian noble families